= Aghzaikas =

Aghzaikas اغزیکاس
- Location within Pakistan
- Coordinates: 32.41°N 69.48°E
- Country: Pakistan
- Territory: Federally Administered Tribal Areas
- Elevation: 1,800 m (5,900 ft)
- Time zone: UTC+5 (PST)
  - Summer (DST): UTC+6 (PDT)

Aghzaikas (Urdu: اغزیکاس) is a town in the Khyber Pakhtunkhwa province of Pakistan. It is located at 32°24'23N 69°28'34E with an altitude of 1800 metres (5908 feet).
